The World Sustainable Development Summit (WSDS) is an annual conference organized by The Energy and Resources Institute (TERI), an independent research institute with multidimensional capabilities. It was instituted in 2001, as the Delhi Sustainable Development Summit (DSDS). WSDS 2023, which is the 22nd edition of the Summit, focused on the umbrella theme: Mainstreaming Sustainable Development and Climate Resilience for Collective Action. The 22nd edition of the Summit took place at February 22-24, 2023 at the India Habitat Centre, New Delhi, India. WSDS brings together political leaders, decision-makers from bilateral and multilateral institutions, business leaders, high-level functionaries from the diplomatic corps, scientists and researchers, media personnel, and members of civil society on a common platform. Over the years, the Summit series has witnessed the participation of 54 Heads of State and Government, 103 Ministers, 13 Nobel Laureates, 1888 Business Leaders, 2745 Speakers, and 38,280 Delegates.

Features of the World Sustainable Development Summit 2023
1. Sustainable Development Leadership Award (SDLA): Awarded every year since 2005 to an eminent global leader, the award felicitates their contributions in the field of sustainable development.

2. Ministerial and High-level sessions: Part of the plenary segment of WSDS, these sessions have panel discussions designed around select themes of environmental importance linked with the overall theme of the Summit. Special addresses include Ministerial Addresses, Science Leadership Addresses, and Leadership Addresses. Speakers include policymakers, business leaders, and academicians.

3. Thematic Tracks: The thematic tracks allow for discussions on finer nuances of the Summit's focus areas. These tracks engage domain experts and practitioners to provide feasible solutions to the challenges faced by the local and global communities in maintaining the balance between securing environmental sustainability and development.

4. Act4Earth: The Act4Earth initiative was launched in the valedictory session of WSDS 2022.

5. Stakeholder Dialogues: As part of the Act4Earth initiative, a series of Stakeholder Dialogues were held in the month of September 2022. The sessions were held on the topics of- COP27 Climate Negotiations; Global Commons and Climate Action; Inclusive Energy Transitions; and Sustainable Consumption and Lifestyles. 

6. CEO Forum: A platform for industry captains to brainstorm ideas for conducting businesses in a sustainable manner. 

7. Youth Connect: A platform to sensitize young students at the school and graduate level about issues of sustainable development and climate change by securing their participation in the Summit's discussions.

Act4Earth 
The Act4Earth Initiative was launched at WSDS 2022’s valedictory session. As part of the initiative, TERI will engage in research activities that intend to identify and analyze practices with the potential for maximum impact across various sectors and systems while being fairly implementable by government and relevant state actors. By reaching out to policymakers, experts, and key stakeholders, the initiative will solicit their input and feedback to come up with policy recommendations aimed at furthering climate action and achieving the Sustainable Development Goals (SDGs).

Delhi Sustainable Development Summit
Since 2001, TERI has annually organized the WSDS, earlier known as the Delhi Sustainable Development Summit, an international platform to facilitate the exchange of knowledge on all aspects of sustainable development. The event brought together various heads of state and government, thought leaders, policy-makers and members of industry and academia to deliberate on myriad issues.

The Summit series has emerged as the premier international event on sustainability that focuses on the global future, but with an eye on the actions in the developing world which could bend our common future.

Sustainable Development Leadership Award
In 2005, The Energy and Resources Institute established the Sustainable Development Leadership Award to felicitate the efforts of global leaders in the field of sustainable development. The award winners are as follows:

References

External links
 World Sustainable Development Summit
The Energy and Resources Institute

International sustainable development
Environmental organisations based in India